The 1947 Svenska Cupen final took place on 24 August 1947 at Råsunda in Solna. It was contested between Allsvenskan sides Malmö FF and AIK. AIK played their first final since 1943 and their second final in total, Malmö FF played their fourth consecutive final and their fourth final in total. Malmö FF won their third title with a 3–2 victory.

Match details

External links
Svenska Cupen at svenskfotboll.se

1947
Cup
Malmö FF matches
AIK Fotboll matches
Football in Stockholm
August 1947 sports events in Europe